Ignacio Jáuregui Díaz (born 31 July 1938) is a Mexican former professional footballer and manager.

Life and career
Jauregui was born in Mexico. He played for Selección de fútbol de México (Mexico national team) in two FIFA World Cup tournaments(1962 and 1966). He also played for Club Atlas and C.F. Monterrey.

After he retired from playing, Jáuregui became a manager. He led Monterrey from 1970 to 1975.

References

External links

Profile at MedioTiempo

1938 births
Living people
Mexico international footballers
Association football defenders
Liga MX players
Atlas F.C. footballers
C.F. Monterrey players
1962 FIFA World Cup players
1966 FIFA World Cup players
Mexican football managers
C.F. Monterrey managers
C.F. Pachuca managers
Deportivo Toluca F.C. managers
Mexico national football team managers
Footballers from Guadalajara, Jalisco
Mexican footballers